Aikaterini Fotopoulou (sometimes Katerina Fotopoulou) is a psychologist and cognitive neuroscientist who is a professor at the University College London Research Department of Clinical, Educational and Health Psychology.  She is the co-founder and current board member of the International Association for the Study of Affective Touch (https://iasat.org/) and the European Cognitive and Affective Neuroscience Society (https://escaneurosci.eu/), a Fellow of the Association for Psychological Sciences (https://www.psychologicalscience.org/) and past co-chair of its International Convention, and the current  President of the Psychology Section of the British Science Association (https://www.britishscienceassociation.org/). Fotopoulou was the past Director of the London Neuropsychoanalysis Centre, Secretary of the International Neuropsychoanalysis Society and coordinator of the London Neuropsychoanalysis Group.

Early life and education 
Fotopoulou was born in Greece. As a child she wanted to become a journalist. She first studied psychology at Panteio University of Social and Political Sciences in Athens. She moved to University College London for her graduate degrees. At UCL, she completed Master's degrees in cognitive neuropsychology and theoretical psychoanalysis. She became particularly inspired by Sigmund Freud and Oliver Sacks. She moved to Durham University for doctoral research, where she studied neurological confabulation. Neurological confabulation is a type of honest, false remembering occurring after damage to the brain, which means that by studying confabulation, Fotopoulou gained insight into the fundamental mechanisms that underpin human memory. Her research indicated that when confabulation occurred after damage to orbital and medial prefrontal cortex (OMPFC), these false memories may have emotional and motivational significance for the patient. Fotopoulou later completed a clinical doctorate in existential psychotherapy with the New School of Psychotherapy and Counselling, leading to her registration with the British Psychological Society, the UK Council for Psychotherapy and the UK’s Health Professions Council as a chartered psychologist. She is currently in private practice in North West London.

Research and career 
Fotopoulou investigates the relationship between mental and somatic health. For example,  she is interested in how people’s sense of self, whether it is their feelings about their own body and its abilities, or their own autobiography, is influenced by either neurological disorders (e.g. stroke or dementia) or psychiatric disease (e.g. eating, somatic and functional disorders). Fotopoulou has published more than 100 papers on these disorders, aiming to understand the psychological and neural mechanisms that cause them as well as the psychophysical interventions that may treat them.

Fotopoulou has also been interested in the mechanisms by which people sooth and support each other’s emotions (termed, social effective regulation). She has explored how the brain responds to pain when family and friends are present. Fotopoulou showed that human touch could be used to soothe social exclusion. In particular, she showed that there was a relationship between gentle touch and social bonding. These findings hinted that there was a physiological system that connected the skin to the brain. She regularly lectures on these topics internationally.

Awards and honours 
 2006 Clifford Yorke Prize
 2010 Hellenic Medical Society of the UK Papanikolaou Prize
 2011 British Neuropsychological Society Elizabeth Warrington Prize
 2013 European Research Council Starting Investigator Grant (The Bodily Self)
 2014 World Economic Forum Distinguished Young Scientist Award
 2015 UCL Queen Square Institute of Neurology Dr Tony Pullen Lecturer of the Year Award
 2018 European Research Council Consolidator Grant

Selected publications

References 

Living people
Alumni of Durham University
Alumni of University College London
National and Kapodistrian University of Athens alumni
Academics of University College London
Year of birth missing (living people)